Mar Thoma I, also known as Valiya Mar Thoma (Mar Thoma the Great) and Arkkadiyokkon Thoma (Archdeacon Thomas) in Malayalam and Thomas de Campo in Portuguese  was the first native-born, popularly-selected Metropolitan bishop of the 17th-century Malankara Church. He was the last Archdeacon of the undivided St. Thomas Christians of Malankara (Maliyankara). 

After the death of Archdeacon George of the Cross on 25 July 1640, Parambil Thoma Kathanar was elected and enthroned as new Archdeacon, when he was less than 30 years old. He led the Church to the Coonan Cross Oath on 3 January 1653 and to the subsequent schism in Nasrani Church. After the Oath, he was elected as a Bishop by the Malankara (Yogam) Association and consecrated as a Bishop at St. Mary's Church Alangad, by laying hands of 12 priests on 22 May 1653. However, some factions of the community, including two Southist churches of Kaduthuruthy and Udayamperoor refused to recognise him as Bishop. 

The archdeacon began to exercise powers of episcopal order, though he openly tried to regularize his episcopal consecration as a Bishop with the Church of Antioch. His episcopal consecration as a Bishop was regularized in the year 1665 by Mar Gregorios Abdal Jaleel the Patriarchal delegate of the Syriac Orthodox Patriarch of Antioch. (The exact date and place of this event is unknown). Palliveettil Mar Chandy, Kadavil Chandy Kathanar, Vengoor Geevargese Kathanar and Anjilimoottil Ittithomman Kathanar were the advisors of the bishop Mar Thoma.

Early Church history
Thomas the Apostle arrived to Kerala to preach the gospel to the Jewish community. Some of the Jews and locals became followers of Jesus of Nazareth. They were known as Malabar Nasrani people and their church as Malankara Church. They followed a unique Hebrew-Syriac Christian tradition which included several Jewish elements and Indian customs. This was the tradition till 1599, when the Malankara Church of St. Thomas Christians in India, formally became part of the Catholic Church by the Synod of Diamper (Udayamperoor). After the Synod of Diamper three Jesuit archbishops ruled their church until 1652. The archdeacons continued to function under these Archbishops.

Early life
Kuravilangad is a town located in the Kottayam district of Kerala, South India. The town is situated in the Meenachil Taluk, about 22 km north of Kottayam. Pakalomattom family was one of the oldest families at Kuravilangad. Thomas who later became the first Mar Thoma, was born in this family.

Archdeacon
Pakalomattom Geevarghese Kathanar, the Arkkadiyakkon (Archdeacon) died in 1637. His relative Thomas Kathanar was then appointed by Archbishop Stephen Britto as the next Archdeacon. Thoma Kathanar and his followers swore the Coonen Cross Oath, that "they would no longer obey Archbishop Garcia or any prelate from the society of Jesus, nor would ever again admit the Jesuits into Malabar or into their churches".

After the Coonen Cross Oath, on 5 January 1653, the elders of the church met at St. Mary's church Edapally (now dedicated to Saint George) and proclaimed Archdeacon Thoma as the Governor of the Church. Four very efficient trustworthy and responsible priests, Kalliseril Anjilimoottil Itty Thomman Kathanar, Kaduthuruthy Kadavil Chandy Kathanar, Angamaly Vengoor Geevarghese Kathanar and  Palliveettil Chandy Kathanar were selected as his advisors. All the three, except Kalliseril Anjilimoottil Itty Thomman Kathanar, later returned to the Catholic faction of the St Thomas Christians.

Four months after Coonen Cross Oath, on 22 May 1653, twelve kathanars (priests) ordained Thoma Kathanar as the first Bishop of Malankara See by the act of laying hands on him together. The Catholic faction argued that his consecration by 12 priests was irregular, from the fact that his consecration as a Bishop is said to have been regularized by Gregorios Abdal Jaleel ( a delegate of the Patriarch of Antioch), in the year AD 1665, but the place and date yet anonymous. They chose the name Mar Thoma as they considered him the successor of St. Thomas the disciple of Jesus Christ. This action was not accepted by two Southist churches-one at Kaduthuruthy and another at Udayamperoor. Later on Bishop Sebastiani (He was ordained as a Bishop on 15 Dec. 1659) could convince many of the Kathanars, including three trustworthy and responsible priests, Kaduthuruthy Kadavil Chandy Kathanar, Angamaly Vengoor Geevarghese Kathanar and Kuravilangad Palliveettil Mar Chandy Kathanar and also many other churches and important laymen that the consecration was irregular. Realizing this and also due to the political and monetary pressure exerted by the Carmelite fathers through the Portuguese and the native kings, many of the churches, Kathanars and laymen now withdrew their allegiance to Mar Thoma. They asked him to give up his dignity of Bishop, which was irregular, but he continued to wear the habit of Bishop and even started giving minor orders and blessing of Holy Oil etc., which acts, only a Bishop is entitled to do. Thus two parties were formed in the Malankara Church-one party under the Bishop Mar Thoma I and the other party under Bishop Palliveettil Mar Chandy referred to by the Europeans as Alexander de Campo (Chandy Parambil). Both of them claimed to have Apostolic briefs of appointment as Bishop. To resolve the issue and as suggested by the Archdeacons party, the case was referred to the King of Cochin. On 20 September 1661, the King of Cochin asked both parties, to present the Apostolic Briefs in his court. The Apostolic Commissary could produce Apostolic briefs from the Pope of Rome, while the Archdeacon's party failed to produce any briefs. On 9 October 1661, Bishop Sebastiani, tried to capture the Bishop Mar Thoma, with the help of the Portuguese General Captain Ignatius Sarmento, one Kurupp of Purakkad and the Cochin prince Godavarma II, from Mulunthuruthy Church, but he and his party escaped, during the previous night, wearing munds (loin cloths), swords, rollers in hands and special hats on their heads, just like gentile soldiers, so that they could not be recognized by the Nair soldiers.

Rise of Dutch power
The Dutch East India Company (Vereenigde Oost-Indische Compagnie or VOC in old-spelling Dutch, literally "United East Indian Company") was established in 1602. By 1652, VOC trading posts were established in Malabar Coast in India. On 7 January 1663, Cochin was attacked and the king of Cochin surrendered to the Dutch on 20 March 1663.

Regularization of consecration
By 1665, Cochin was under Dutch control. That year Gregorios Abdal Jaleel, a delegate of the Patriarch of Antioch came to Malankara as per the request of Mar Thoma and regularized his Metropolitan consecration.

Last days
The last days of Thoma I was comparatively peaceful period for the Puthencoor faction of the Malankara Church.

Valiya Thoma, Thoma I, died on 25 April 1670 and was laid to rest in St. Mary's Jacobite Soonoro Cathedral, Angamaly.

See also
Malankara Metropolitan
List of Malankara Metropolitans

References

Further reading
Mathew N. M. (2003). St. Thomas Christians of Malabar Through Ages, C.S.S. Tiruvalla.  and CN 80303.
Mathew, N. M. Malankara Marthoma Sabha Charitram (History of the Marthoma Church), Volume 1 (2006), Volume II (2007), Volume III (2008). Pub. E.J.Institute, Thiruvalla.
The Grave Tragedy of the Church of St. Thomas Christians and the Apostolic Mission of Sebastiani, Paul Pallath, HIRS Publications.
The troubled Days Francis Garcia SJ, Archbp. of Cranganore, Joseph Thekkedathu SDB, Universita Gregoriana Editrice.

Christian clergy from Kottayam
Indian bishops
Pakalomattam family
1670 deaths
Year of birth unknown
Syriac Orthodox Church bishops
Oriental Orthodoxy in India
17th-century Indian people
Malankara Orthodox Syrian Church Christians 
Malankara Orthodox Syrian Church bishops 
Malankara Orthodox Syrian Church saints 
Saint Thomas Christians